The Kickback is the only studio album by American hip hop group Cali Swag District.

Originally to be released under Capitol Records, the album experienced numerous delays. With Capitol Records' parent company, EMI, facing an uncertain future, CSD requested to be released from the Capitol contract. The group eventually signed with Sphinx Music Entertainment/319 Music Group and The Kickback was distributed by Sony/RED on July 12, 2011.

Reception

The Kickback received positive reviews from critics. On Metacritic, the album holds a score of 67/100 based on 5 reviews, indicating "generally favorable reviews".

Track listing 
Track listing revealed by iTunes Store.
All tracks are produced by RunWay Star.

References 

2011 debut albums
Cali Swag District albums
Sony Records albums